Lake Mansarovar (Sanskrit: मानसरोवर), also called Mapam Yutso locally, is a high altitude freshwater lake fed by the Kailash Glaciers near Mount Kailash in Burang County, Ngari Prefecture, Tibet Autonomous Region, China. The lake along with Mount Kailash to its north are sacred sites in four religions: Hinduism, Jainism, Buddhism and Bön.

Etymology 
The Sanskrit word "Mansarovar" (मानसरोवर) is a combination of two Sanskrit words; "Mānas" (मानस्) meaning "mind (in its widest sense as applied to all the mental powers), intellect, intelligence, understanding, perception, sense, conscience" while "sarovara" (सरोवर) means "a lake or a large pond deep enough for a lotus".

Geography 

It is located about 50 kilometers to the northwest of Nepal, about 100 kilometers east of Uttarakhand, and in the southwest region of Tibet. It freezes in the winter. According to Brockman, it is one of the highest freshwater lakes in Asia (with the highest being the Tilicho Lake in Nepal at altitude of 4919 m).

It is connected to nearby Lake Rakshastal by the natural Ganga Chhu channel. Lake Mansarovar is near the source of the Sutlej, which is the easternmost large tributary of the Indus. Nearby are the sources of the Brahmaputra River, the Indus River, and the Karnali, an important tributary of the Ganges.

Lake Mansarovar overflows into Lake Rakshastal which is a salt-water endorheic lake. When the level of Lake Rakshastal matched that of Lake Mansarovar, these (very narrowly) combined lakes overflowed into the Sutlej basin.

Lake Mansarovar and Mount Kailash are visible from the Lapcha La pass, located above the Limi valley in district Humla, Nepal. 

In May 2020, India inaugurated a new 80 km long motorable road from Dharchula to Lipulekh Pass along the India-China border under the geostrategic India-China Border Roads project to the Kailas-Manasarovar in Tibet.

Climate

Access 
Lake Manasarovar lies near Mount Kailash, and is an integral part of a Kailash-Manasarovar pilgrimage.

History and texts
There is no mention of the lake (or its location) in Vedic literature or ancient Sanskrit and Prakrit texts. Though colonial era and modern texts state Manasarovar to be among the most sacred sites of Indian religions, particularly Hinduism, this status is not found in early Indian texts prior to texts authored in the 1st millennium CE. Instead, the early Buddhist, Hindu and Jain texts mention a mythical Mount Meru and lake Manasa. The mythical Manasa lake is described as one created through the mind of Brahma as the preferred abode of his vahana hamsa.

While there is no explicit mention of this lake or the nearby mountain in ancient Sanskrit texts, there is indirect mention of this region of Tibet in hymn 2.15 of the Rigveda. There it says that Indus river keeps flowing north because of Indra's power, a geographical reality only in Tibet. This is in the context of Himavant (or the Himalayas). According to Frits Staal, a Sanskrit and Vedic studies scholar, this makes it likely that some among the ancient Vedic people had traced the Indus river route and had seen the valley near Mount Kailash. However, there is no mention of this lake or it being a tirtha (pilgrimage site).

Typically, major historic pilgrimage sites that were frequented by Buddhists, Hindus and Jains attracted a discussion in their respective texts and the construction of infrastructure by wealthy patrons or kings. In Hinduism, these were the mahatmya chapters in the Puranas, and the infrastructure include temples, dharmasalas, ashrams and pilgrimage facilities. At least until the 1930s, there is no evidence of such structures in the Kailash-Manasarovar region.

The earliest verifiable reports that confirm that this lake site attracted pilgrims are those of the Buddhists. According to Luciano Petech, Tibetan records confirm that Buddhists considered the region now identified as Kailasa and Manasarovar to be their sacred geography by late 12th-century, with many reports of Buddhist monks meditating in the Go-zul cave of Kailash and circumambulating the mountain.

According to Alex McKay, the possible synthesis of esoteric Buddhism and Shaivism in Nepal, Tibet and eastern region of India may have expanded and brought Kailash and lake Manasarovar into the shared sacred geography for both Buddhists and Hindus. The 13th-century text Mahanirvana Tantra dedicates it first chapter to Kailash and Manasarovar lake as a pilgrimage site. This may have been coupled with the re-discovery of its importance to major rivers on the subcontinent.

Between 1901 and 1905, southern Tibet became strategically important to the British Empire. The colonial era officials decided to encourage and assist religious pilgrimage to this lake and Kailash with comments such as "a devotee will be the pioneer of trade". By 1907, about 150 pilgrims a year visited this site, a number significantly higher than those in the 19th century. The number of Indian pilgrims grew to 730 by 1930. Pilgrimage road and facilities to this lake and Kailash were constructed by Indians, in cooperation with Tibetan monks and officials, along the route after 1930.

Religious significance

In Hinduism 
Lake Manasarovar and Mount Kailash are believed to be the abode of Shiva. This is where the holy river the Ganges is believed to be tamed by Shiva and sent to nourish the fertile valleys below the Himalayas. It is sometimes conflated with Meru. For the Khas Hindu shamans of the nearby region of Humla (northwest Nepal), a ritual bath in Lake Manasarovar is an important step in gaining their shamanic powers.

In the Bon religion 
The Bon religion is also associated with the holy place of Zhang Zhung Meri sacred deity. When Tonpa Shenrab, the founder of the Bon religion, visited Tibet for the first time and bathed in the lake.

In Buddhism 
Buddhists associate the lake as the mother principle, with Kailash as the father principle. The Yamantaka shrine here is one of the eight guardian deities, who is shown in the act of a sexual embrace to unite compassion and wisdom. A traditional 32-mile circuit around the mountain, called kora, is believed to be particularly holy walk.

The lake has a few monasteries on its shores, the most notable of which is the ancient Chiu Monastery built on a steep hill, looking as if it has been carved right out of the rock.

In Jainism 
In Jainism, Lake Manasarovar is associated with the first Tirthankara, Rishabha. As per Jain scriptures, the first Tirthankar, Bhagwan Rishabhdev, had attained nirvana on the Ashtapad Mountain. The son of Bhagwan Rishabhdev, Chakravati Bharat, had built a palace adorned with gems on the Ashtapad Mountain located in the Himalayas. There are many stories related to Ashtapad Maha Tirth like Kumar and Sagar's sons, Tapas Kher Parna, Ravan and Mandodri Bhakti, among many others.

Gallery

See also
 Mount Kailash
 Adi Kailash
 Char Dham
 Hindu pilgrimage sites in India 
 Kalapani territory 
 Rakshas Tal
 Yatra

Notes

References

External links 

 

Lakes of Tibet
Sacred lakes
Indus basin
Hindu temples
Buddhist temples
Brahmaputra River
Ganges basin